Kishti Tomita (born 19 November 1963) is a Swedish voice coach, TV personality and singer. Together with A&R manager Daniel Breitholtz and manager and talent scout Peter Swartling she was a part of the Swedish Idol 2004, Idol 2005, Idol 2006 and Idol 2007 jury.

On 26 February 2008, it was revealed that Kishti had quit the Idol jury and would not appear in Idol 2008; none of the other two jury members attended the next season.

On 10 May, Tomita was a background singer for the Russian entry in the Eurovision Song Contest 2011 after one of the other Swedish background singers became ill. In 2014, she discovered that she had Asperger syndrome.

Tomita returned as a judge in Idol 2017.

References

External links 
 
 
 Answers.com about Idol 2005

Swedish television personalities
Living people
1963 births
People with Asperger syndrome